Tajikistan competed at the 2022 World Athletics Championships in Eugene, United States, from 15 to 24 July 2022.

Results
Tajikistan entered 1 athletes.

Men 
Track and road events

References

External links
Oregon22｜WCH 22｜World Athletics

Nations at the 2022 World Athletics Championships
World Championships in Athletics
Tajikistan at the World Championships in Athletics